Pandit Falguni Mitra is a Hindustani classical vocalist who is known as a Dhrupad exponent of India. Mitra belongs to the Bettiah gharana.

Mitra combines the Dagar style of “Alaapchari” with the Betia style of Dhrupad and Dhamaar .

Early life
Mitra was initiated into music by his father, Sangeetacharya Shib Mitra, at the age of five.

Education and work
Mitra completed his Intermediate from St. Xaviers College, Kolkata; Bachelor's Degree from Vivekananda College, University of Madras and then earned a master's degree in Philosophy from the University of Madras.

Mitra had a career in management with a multinational, Cookson Group PLC. Along with his professional career, he also pursued music and took it to an extent which was to be soon recognized as his own rendition of Dhrupad, in India and across the world.

Mitra was the Guru and Prefect of ITC Sangeet Research Academy, Kolkata from 1999 to 2010

Mitra has conducted lecture-demonstrations and written articles in journals in Indai and also abroad.

Music career

Mitra is a performer in the Indian music circuit. He is known for his mastery in the Dhrupad style of the Betia Banaras Gharana along with the Dagar alap style.    He sings alap, nomtom and Dhrupad compositions in all the four Banis, namely, Gaurhar, Dagur, Nauhar and Khandar. He avoids splitting the words during upaj and thereby preserves the poetic integrity of those compositions. He is also known to sing many rare ragas in the Dhrupad style.

Some memorable performances 

 ‘Tansen Sangeet Sammelan‘, Kolkata, 1956
 ‘Sangeet Rasika Sabha', New Delhi Kali Bari, 1957
 ‘Sadarang Sangeet Sammelan’, Kolkata, 1963 
 ‘Sarba Bharatiya Sangeet Sammelan’, Kolkata, 1963, 1965
 ‘Bhawanipore Sangeet Sammilani’, Kolkata, 1963, 1966, 1969, 1972, 1978, 1981, 1995, 1999, 2000, 2001, 2002, 2003
 ‘Sursringar Sammelan‘, Mumbai, 1976 
 ‘Sursagar Society Sangeet Sammelan’, Kolkata, 1975, 1977, 1979. 1980, 1982, 1985, 1990, 1995, 2000 
 ‘Akhil Bharatiya Dhrupad Sammelan’, Varanasi, 1976, 1977, 1979, 2000, 2005, 2010, 2011
 ‘Tansen Sangeet Samaroah‘, Raipur, 1978
 ‘Akhil Bharatiya Dhmpad Sammelan‘, Nathdwara, Rajasthan, 1981
 ‘Kalakshetra Art Festival’, Kalakshetra Foundation, Chennai, 1984
 ‘Tansen Sangeet Sammelan‘, Chennai, 1986, 1987, 1988, 1989
 ‘Ustad Chand Khan Memorial Conference’, New Delhi 1995 
 ‘West Bengal State Music Academy Conference, Kolkata, 1997, 1998, 1999, 2000, 2001, 2003, 2006, 2008, 2010
 ‘Dover Lane Music Conference‘, Kolkata, 2000, 2002
 ‘Sangeet Research Academy Music Circle’, Kolkata, 2000 
 ‘Salt Lake Music Conference‘, Kolkata, 2000 
 ‘Bangiya Sangeet Parishad Music Conference’, Kolkata, 2002
lTC Sangeet Research Academy Conference, Raipur, Kanpur, 2004
Indian Council for Cultural Relations, Kolkata, 2007 
lTC Sangeet Research Academy Conference, Mumbai, 2008 
Sangeet Natak Akademi Conference, Bangalore, 2009 
Sangeet Natak Akademi Conference, Brindavan, 2010
Prakriti Foundation Gharana Festival, Chennai, 2010 
Kala Prakash music festival, Varanasi, 2010 
Tansen Sangeet Samaroah, Gwalior, 2010 
Eastern Zone Cultural Center, Kolkata, 2011

Notable works
 Program in collaboration with Smt. S. Sowmya on original Hindustani and Carnatic songs followed by Rabindranath Tagore's compositions on the same, Music Academy, Chennai. 1996 
Pandit Mitra composed music for Smt. Rukmini Devi Arundale, dance ballet Meera of Mewar at Kalakshetra Foundation, Chennai, 1985.
Artist at Prakriti Foundation

Honors 

 Honored by the South Madras Cultural Association on 3 March 1996.

 Dhrupad Ratna by Dhrupad Kala Kendra, Indore on 28 March 1998.
Sangeet Ratna Alankaran by Sree Kashi Sangeet Samaj on 19 February 2012.
Sangeet Bharati by Sri Satyananda Mahapith, Jadavpur on 26 February 2016.
Ballava Gandharva

External links 
Bettiah gharana

References

External links
 Official profile

Hindustani singers
Indian classical musicians of Bengal
Living people
1942 births
Women musicians from West Bengal